Bruneau Dunes State Park is a public recreation and geologic preservation area in the western United States, located in Owyhee County in southwestern Idaho.

The park encompasses  and features the Bruneau Dunes Observatory, where visitors can use a telescope for stargazing.

Natural history
Geology
The park's dunes are unique in the Western Hemisphere: where others in the Americas form at the edge of a natural basin, the Bruneau dunes form near the center. The basin has acted as a natural trap for over 12,000 years. The dunes may have started with sands from the Bonneville Flood about 15,000 years ago. With prevailing winds blowing from the southeast 28 percent of the time and from the northwest 32 percent of the time, the dunes stay fairly stable, and unlike most dunes, do not drift far.
Flora and fauna
The state park includes desert, dune, prairie, lake and marsh habitat. Desert wildlife is prominent along with birds of prey and waterfowl.

Park history
Land for the park was purchased under the Recreation and Public Purposes Act in May 1967.

Recreation
Activities include sandboarding, fishing, birdwatching, camping, hiking, swimming, and viewing the stars at the public observatory. No motorized vehicles are allowed on the dunes but climbing and sledding are permitted. An educational center offers natural history displays and a gift shop. The astronomical observatory is open Friday and Saturday evenings mid-March through mid-October. Two cabins, 82 RV sites (with water/electricity) and 32 standard sites are available year round in two campgrounds: Eagle Cove Campground and Broken Wheel Campground. An equestrian overnight facility, with corrals, is also available. Fishing for bass and bluegill is popular in the park's small lake. Only non-motorized canoes, rafts and float tubes are allowed.

See also

 List of Idaho state parks
 National Parks in Idaho

Notes

References

External links

Bruneau Dunes State Park Idaho Parks and Recreation 
Bruneau Dunes State Park Map Idaho Parks and Recreation

Dunes of the United States
State parks of Idaho
Protected areas of Owyhee County, Idaho
Protected areas established in 1967
Landforms of Owyhee County, Idaho